Isabel Taylor (born 21 December 1956) is a Cuban sprinter. She competed in the women's 100 metres at the 1976 Summer Olympics.

References

1956 births
Living people
Athletes (track and field) at the 1976 Summer Olympics
Athletes (track and field) at the 1979 Pan American Games
Cuban female sprinters
Olympic athletes of Cuba
Place of birth missing (living people)
Pan American Games medalists in athletics (track and field)
Pan American Games bronze medalists for Cuba
Medalists at the 1979 Pan American Games
Central American and Caribbean Games medalists in athletics
Olympic female sprinters
20th-century Cuban women